Fantina may refer to:
 Fantina, a character from Pokémon
 Fantina, a former town on one side of a river separated from Fondachelli

See also